is a Japanese footballer who plays for Veertien Mie.

Club statistics
Updated to 23 December 2019.

References

External links

Profile at Renofa Yamaguchi
Profile at Gainare Tottori

1992 births
Living people
Kansai University alumni
Association football people from Hyōgo Prefecture
Japanese footballers
J2 League players
J3 League players
Japan Football League players
Renofa Yamaguchi FC players
Gainare Tottori players
Veertien Mie players
Association football forwards